Arthur Kenneth Jones known as A. K. Jones (1887 – 1975) was an English international badminton player. He was born in Southampton.

Career 
Arthur Kenneth Jones won the 1925 All England Badminton Championships in the men's doubles event. Until 1977 the tournament was the unofficial world championships.
Jones was a pioneer of the sport. In 1925–26 he belonged to an English touring team, who travelled to Canada and the United States for two months to develop the sport in those countries on behalf of the Canadian Badminton Association which had recently been formed in 1921.

Records

Personal life
He was a bank clerk by profession and lived in Richmond, Surrey. He died in Salisbury.

References

External links 
 All England Champions 1899–2007
 Records of the Badminton Association of England

1887 births
1975 deaths
English male badminton players
Sportspeople from Southampton